Podium  is a 2004 French comedy/fantasy film directed by Yann Moix starring Belgian actor Benoît Poelvoorde, Jean-Paul Rouve and Julie Depardieu.

Plot
Bernard Frédéric (Poelvoorde) is a mediocre bank executive, married and with a son. He used to have another profession: to be French star Claude François. Now, with the "Imitators Gala Night" coming up, he must choose between his wife or the only thing that makes him fully happy: the applause.

Cast
 Benoît Poelvoorde as Bernard Frédéric
 Jean-Paul Rouve as Couscous
 Julie Depardieu as Véro
 Marie Guillard as Vanessa
 Anne Marivin as Anne
 Nadège Beausson-Diagne as Nadège
 Odile Vuillemin as Odile
 Nicolas Jouxtel as Sébastien
 Olivier Mag as Claude David
 Armelle as Laure
 Evelyne Thomas as herself/Elle-même
 Karine Lyachenko as Jacqueline
 Bruno Abraham-Kremer as Monsieur Lombard
 Dominique Besnehard as Le psychologue

Awards

Won
 Joseph Plateau Awards, Belgium
 Best Belgian Actor (Benoît Poelvoorde)

Nominated
 César Awards, France
 Best Actor (Benoît Poelvoorde)
 Best Costume Design (Catherine Bouchard)
 Best First Work (Yann Moix)
 Best Supporting Actor (Jean-Paul Rouve)
 Best Supporting Actress (Julie Depardieu)

References

External links
 
 Awards and nominations received by Podium

2004 films
2000s fantasy comedy films
French fantasy comedy films
2000s French-language films
2004 comedy films
2000s French films